Axel Heiberg (1848–1932) is a Norwegian diplomat, financier and patron.

Axel Heiberg may also refer to:

 Axel Heiberg (judge) (1908–1988), Norwegian judge

Places
 Axel Heiberg Glacier, Antarctica
 Axel Heiberg Island, Canada
 Heiberg Islands, Russia